The 2021 Supercoppa Italiana (branded as the 2021 Supercoppa Italiana Ferrovie dello Stato Italiane for sponsorship reasons) was the 25th edition of the Supercoppa Italiana.

Just like the previous edition, on 16 April 2021, it was announced that the format would be extended from two to four teams. It was contested by Juventus the 2020–21 Serie A champions, Roma the 2020–21 Coppa Italia champions, Milan and Sassuolo. For the second time in a row, the competition was played in the calendar year following the end of Serie A and the Coppa Italia.

The matches were played in Frosinone at Stadio Benito Stirpe between 5-8 January 2022 and Juventus won for the third time in a row.

Qualified teams

Matches 
The draw was made on 24 November 2021.

Bracket

Semi-finals

Final

Broadcasting 
Italian broadcasters La7 and La7d has secured linear and digital rights to domestic women’s club football competitions for the 2021–22
and 2022–23 seasons as part of an extended rights deal with the Italian Football Federation, which includes Supercoppa Italiana.

See also
Supercoppa Italiana (women)

References

Football in Italy
Sport in Italy
Football competitions in Italy
2021–22 in Italian women's football
Supercoppa Italiana (women)